Littletown is one of the constituent settlements of the district of Liversedge, West Yorkshire, England. Historically part of the West Riding of Yorkshire, much of the town centre was demolished in the 1960s for road widening.

Although local residents always refer to it as a town, its size and population are similar to that of a village. Although it is literally a little town the place name is reputedly named after a Mr Little.

Heavy Woollen District
Populated places in West Yorkshire